In military terms, 62nd Division may refer to:

 Infantry divisions 
62nd Infantry Division (Wehrmacht)
62nd (2nd West Riding) Division (United Kingdom)  
62nd Infantry Division (United States)  
62nd Infantry Division Marmarica - Italian Army (Second World War)
62nd Division (Imperial Japanese Army)
 Cavalry divisions 
62nd Cavalry Division (United States)

See also
62nd Regiment (disambiguation)